is the eighth and final studio album by Japanese entertainer Eriko Tamura. Released through Eastworld on September 22, 1993, the album features the singles "Ningyō no T-shirt" and "Ashita no Yukue", as well as covers of the Debbie Gibson songs "Out of the Blue" and "Shake Your Love".

Track listing

References

External links
 

1993 albums
Japanese-language albums